Manuel Scorza (September 9, 1928November 27, 1983) was an important Peruvian novelist, poet, and political activist, exiled under the regime of Manuel Odría. He was born in Lima.

Life and career
Scorza was a member of a student group affiliated with the American Popular Revolutionary Alliance (APRA) called The Poets of the People.

He is best known for the series of five novels, known collectively as "The Silent War," that began with Redoble por Rancas (1970). All five have been translated into more than forty languages, including English.

He died when his plane, Avianca Flight 011, crashed on approach to Madrid's Barajas Airport after striking a series of hilltops.  The crash killed 181 passengers, including Mexican novelist and playwright Jorge Ibargüengoitia, Uruguayan writer, academic, and literary critic Ángel Rama, and Argentinian art critic Marta Traba.

Publications 
 Las Imprecaciones  (1955)
 Los adioses (1959)
 Desengaños del mago (1961)
 Poesía amorosa (1963)
 El vals de los reptiles (1970)
 Poesía incompleta (1970)
 "The Silent War" novels:
 Redoble por Rancas  (1970) (Drums for Rancas, translated by Edith Grossman, 1977)
 Historia de Garabombo el Invisible (1972) (Garabombo, the Invisible, translated by Anna-Marie Aldaz, 1994)
 El Jinete Insomne (1977) (The Sleepless Rider, translated by Anna-Marie Aldaz, 1996)
 Cantar de Agapito Robles  (1977) (The Ballad of Agapito Robles, translated by Anna-Marie Aldaz, 1999)
 La Tumba del Relámpago  (1979) (Requiem for a Lightning Bolt, translated by Anna-Marie Aldaz, 2000)
 La danza inmóvil  (1983)

See also
Peruvian literature
 List of Peruvian writers
Guillermo Carnero Hoke, another member of Los Poetas Del Pueblo

References

Hernández, Consuelo. "Crónica, historiografía e imaginación en las novelas de Manuel Scorza." Beyond Indigenous Voices. Laila/Alila 11th International Symposium on Latin American Indian literatures. Edited by Mary H. Preuss. Pennsylvania State University. 1996. pp. 143–150.

External links 
 Biography
 "Sobre la irrealidad total, he puesto la realidad absoluta" (Interview, 1979)
 

1928 births
1983 deaths
Avianca Flight 011 victims
Male novelists
National University of San Marcos alumni
Peruvian male poets
Peruvian novelists
20th-century male writers
20th-century novelists
20th-century Peruvian poets
Writers from Lima